Viktor Gažík (born 13 December 2001) is a Slovak chess player who has held the titles of International Master (IM) (2016) and Grandmaster (GM) (2022).

Biography
Viktor Gažík is multiple winner of Slovak Youth Chess Championships in different age groups. He played for Slovakia in European Youth Chess Championships and World Youth Chess Championships in the different age groups and best results reached in 2010 in Batumi, when he won European Youth Chess Championship in the U10 age group and in 2018 in Chalkidiki, when he won World Youth Chess Championship in the U18 age group.

Viktor Gažík won the Slovakia International Chess Tournament Prievidza (2015) and Chess Masters Pieniny (2017).

In 2016, he was awarded the FIDE International Master (IM) title. In 2022, he was awarded the Grandermaster (GM) title by FIDE.

References

External links

Viktor Gažík chess games at 365chess.com

2001 births
Living people
Slovak chess players
Chess International Masters